Ferrario is an Italian surname. Notable people with the surname include:

 Bill Ferrario (born 1928), American footballer
 Carlo Ferrario (born 1986), Italian footballer

 Joseph Anthony Ferrario (1926–2003), American Roman Catholic bishop

 Moreno Ferrario (born 1959), Italian footballer

 Richard E. Ferrario (1931-1985), American educator and politician
 Rino Ferrario (born 1926), Italian footballer
 Rosina Ferrario (1888-1957), Italian aviator
 Ruggero Ferrario (1897–1976), Italian footballer
 Stefano Ferrario, Italian footballer

See also 
 Ferrari
 Ferrario reaction
 Villa Carminati-Ferrario
 Ferario Spasov (born 1962), Bulgarian football coach and manager

Italian-language surnames
Occupational surnames